Wisline Dolce (born 22 November 1986) is a Haitian former footballer who played as a midfielder. She has been a member of the Haiti women's national team.

Club career
Dolce has played for AS Tigresses in Haiti.

References

External links 
 

1986 births
Living people
Haitian women's footballers
Women's association football midfielders
Haiti women's international footballers